Rain from the Sun is the debut album of James Lowery, at the time known as "Native Funk". Lowery later adopted the name "Anybody Killa" and signed to Psychopathic Records, releasing his second album, Hatchet Warrior in 2003. Rain from the Sun was reissued in 2006, with a bonus EP, Rattlesnake.

Track listing

Original version
"Intro" - 0:41
"Solo" - 2:46
"Is It Real?" - 2:17
"Interview" - 1:43
"Boom" - 3:38
"Cloned Images" - 4:20
"Takin' Over" (Feat. Dago and YUG) - 3:50
"True Tales" - 2:36
"Guillotine" (Feat. Halfbreed) - 4:55
"State of Mind" - 4:16
"Gratiot Confusion" - 1:08
"Slangtown" (Feat. Dead Mike) - 4:17
"Rain From the Sun" (Feat. Lavel) - 3:55
"Outro" - 0:40

Reissue

Disc one
Intro
Solo
Is It Real
Interviews
Cloned Images
Taken Over (Feat. Dago and YUG)
Guillotine (Feat. Halfbreed)
State Of Mind
Rain From The Sun (Feat. Lavel)

Disc two (Rattlesnake)
Intro
Caught Up
This One's on Me
Rattlesnake
Guillotine Pt.2 Featuring Strict-9
Keep Rollin?
Get it Together Pt.2 Featuring Strict-9

References

2000 debut albums
Anybody Killa albums